Pacifico Yokohama (パシフィコ横浜, Pashifiko Yokohama), officially known as , is a convention and exhibition center in Nishi-ku, Yokohama, Kanagawa, Japan. The center located in the western tip of waterfront Minato Mirai 21 district is one of the largest MICE venues in the nation.

The Conference Center and Yokohama Grand InterContinental Hotel were completed first on July 29, 1991 with the Exhibition Hall subsequently completed on October 12. On April 25, 1994, National Convention Hall of Yokohama was completed. In 2001 it was designated the main press centre for the 2002 FIFA World Cup and the Exhibition Hall was expanded.

The word "Pacifico" which stands for "Pacific" is derived from the Latin "pacificus" ("peace" in English), primarily meaning "peaceful" or "quiet". Pacifico Yokohama is also used as a music venue. The venue will also host Miss International on October 29, 2020.

Past events 
 2007 Worldcon (65th World Science Fiction Convention)
 2008 World Robot Olympiad
 2008 Tokyo International Conference on African Development 
 2009 SIGGRAPH 
 2010 Asia-Pacific Economic Cooperation (APEC Japan 2010)
2012 Type-Moon Fes.
 2019 Fanmeeting: SONE Japan presents - Taeyeon's Atelier-
 2023 Kara 15th Anniversary Fan Meeting 2023 ～Move Again～

Upcoming events 
 2023 Pokémon World Championships

References

External links 

 official site

Convention centers in Japan
Buildings and structures in Yokohama
Tourist attractions in Yokohama
Boxing venues in Japan
Event venues established in 1991
1991 establishments in Japan